Season twenty of the television program American Experience was originally shown on the PBS network in the United States on January 14, 2008, and concluded on May 6, 2008. The show celebrated its 20th anniversary. The season contained 14 new episodes and began with the film Oswald's Ghost. The last eight parts of the 14-part Eyes on the Prize miniseries were a rebroadcast of the production originally shown during 1990 on PBS. It was shown as a special presentation of American Experience during February in observance of Black History Month.

Episodes

 Denotes multiple chapters that aired on the same date and share the same episode number

References

2008 American television seasons
American Experience